KZN Capital 104fm is a South African community radio station based in Pietermaritzburg, KwaZulu-Natal which started broadcasting in mid-2014. The station was founded by Jerry Jones, a former municipal employee, mobile DJ and community radio presenter.

History 
Jones had been applying for funding for a radio station for Pietermaritzburg for over 25 years, from various sources. In 2011, an application was made to the Independent Communications Authority of South Africa (ICASA) who granted a community radio licence. In 2013, an application and presentation for funding was made to the Media Development and Diversity Agency (MDDA), a statutory development agency for promoting and ensuring media development and diversity. The application was successful and funds were made available to equip the station with a broadcasting studio and a production studio.

Premises were secured at 152 Langalalibele Street in Pietermaritzburg. The transmitter is situated at the Worlds View base station.

Output
The station broadcasts 24 hours a day and is streamed online. The weekday format is breakfast, mid-morning, afternoon and drive shows with presenters from the local community. Evening shows cover community affairs, as well as talk, sport and music.

At weekends the station broadcasts a Saturday breakfast show, a motoring show and an Afrikaans community show followed by current affairs shows and sport with Sundays catering for various religious communities and a specific show aimed at youth and children.

The station has no fixed music policy due to the wide age and cultural demographic.

References 

Community radio stations in South Africa
Mass media in Pietermaritzburg